KTOQ (1340 AM) is a radio station broadcasting a sports format. Licensed to Rapid City, South Dakota, United States, the station serves the Rapid City area. The station is currently owned by Haugo Broadcasting, Inc., and features programming from ESPN Radio and Westwood One.

In 1998, Haugo Broadcasting (owner of KSQY) acquired Rapid City stations KIQK "Kick 104" and KTOQ "K-Talk 1340" from Tom-Tom Broadcasting, then owned by NBC news anchor Tom Brokaw. Soon after the purchase, KSQY moved its studios to Rapid City and joined its new sister stations. In September 2008, Haugo Broadcasting moved into its new facilities at 3601 Canyon Lake Drive.

In April 2012, KTOQ changed its format to sports, with programming from ESPN Radio.

In March 2013, it began simulcasting its signal on 105.7 FM.

References

External links

TOQ
Sports radio stations in the United States
Radio stations established in 1953